Paolo Bonaiuti (7 July 1940 – 16 October 2019) was an Italian politician and journalist.

Biography
Born in Florence, Bonaiuti graduated in Law. He was English teacher and worked as a copywriter in the field of advertising. He was also head of the economic service of the newspaper Il Giorno and since 1975 he was a special correspondent, first for economics and finance, then for international political events. In 1984 he entered Il Messaggero as an envoy and as a columnist, following above all the G7 summits, the war events and investigations of the Europe's changes. In 1992 he became deputy director of the newspaper. He has also collaborated with the BBC, with the RSI and with other foreign media.

In 1996 Bonaiuti joined Forza Italia and was elected Deputy. Re-elected in 2001, he served as Undersecretary of State in the second and in the third Berlusconi government.

From 2008 to 2011 he served as spokesman of the fourth Berlusconi government.

After four legislatures as Deputy, in 2013 Bonaiuti was elected Senator with The People of Freedom. In November 2013 he joined the reborn Forza Italia, but on 21 April 2014 he left it to join the New Centre-Right led by Angelino Alfano.

References

External links
senato.it

1940 births
2019 deaths
Politicians from Florence
Forza Italia politicians
The People of Freedom politicians
Forza Italia (2013) politicians
New Centre-Right politicians
Popular Alternative politicians
Deputies of Legislature XIII of Italy
Deputies of Legislature XIV of Italy
Deputies of Legislature XV of Italy
Deputies of Legislature XVI of Italy
Senators of Legislature XVII of Italy
Journalists from Florence